Michael English (17 September 1882 – 1 September 1937) was an Australian rules footballer who played with St Kilda in the Victorian Football League (VFL).

References

External links 

1882 births
1937 deaths
Australian rules footballers from Melbourne
St Kilda Football Club players
Australian military personnel of World War I
Military personnel from Melbourne